The Reserve Infantry Division of Weinan was a short-lived reserve infantry formation of the People's Liberation Army active between 1983 and 1985.

The division was formally activated in December 1983 in Weinan, Shaanxi. The division was then composed of:
1st Regiment
2nd Regiment
3rd Regiment
Artillery Regiment - Dali County

In October 1985 the division was disbanded along with all its subordinates.

References

Reserve divisions of the People's Liberation Army
Military units and formations established in 1984